The Torneo Guardianes 2020 (stylized as Guard1anes) Liga MX final phase was played between 21 November 2020 to 13 December 2020. A total of 12 teams competed in the final phase to decide the champions of the Guardianes 2020 Liga MX season. For the first time since the Clausura 2008 season, an additional qualifying round, the reclassification or repechaje, was employed, expanding the number of playoff spots from eight to 12.

Due to the COVID-19 pandemic in Mexico, all matches in the final phase were held behind closed doors.

Both finalists qualified to the 2022 CONCACAF Champions League.

Qualified teams
The following teams qualified for the championship stage.

In the following tables, the number of appearances, last appearance, and previous best result count only those in the short tournament era starting from Invierno 1996 (not counting those in the long tournament era from 1943–44 to 1995–96).

Format

Reclassification
All games were played in a single-leg hosted by the higher seed
If a game ended in a draw, it proceeded directly to a penalty shoot-out.

Liguilla
Teams were re-seeded each round.
The winners of the Reclassification matches were seeded based on their ranking in the classification table.
Team with more goals on aggregate after two matches advanced.
Away goals rule was applied in the quarter-finals and semi-finals, but not the final.
In the quarter-finals and semi-finals, if the two teams were tied on aggregate and away goals, the higher seeded team advanced.
In the final, if the two teams were tied after both legs, the match went to extra time and, if necessary, a shoot-out.
Both finalists qualified to the 2022 CONCACAF Champions League.

Reclassification

Summary
Matches took place on 21–22 November 2020.

|}

Matches

Seeding
The following was the final seeding for the final phase. The winners of the Reclassification matches were seeded based on their position in the classification table.

Bracket

Quarter-finals

Summary
The first legs were played on 25–26 November, and the second legs were played on 28–29 November.

|}

First leg

Second leg

León won 3–2 on aggregate.

Guadalajara won 3–1 on aggregate.

UNAM	won 1–0 on aggregate.

Cruz Azul won 3–2 on aggregate.

Semi-finals

Summary
The first legs were played on 2–3 December, and the second legs were played on 5–6 December.

|}

First leg

Second leg

León won 2–1 on aggregate.

4–4 on aggregate. UNAM advanced due to being the higher seed in the classification table.

Finals

|}

First leg

Details

Statistics

Second leg

León won 3–1 on aggregate.

Details

Statistics

Statistics

Goalscorers

Assists
2 assists
 Roberto Alvarado (Cruz Azul) 
 Javier Aquino (UANL)
 Orbelín Pineda (Cruz Azul)

1 assist
 Érick Aguirre (Pachuca)
 Uriel Antuna (Guadalajara)
 Joel Campbell (León)
 Víctor Dávila (Pachuca)
 Alonso Escoboza (América)
 Santiago Giménez (Cruz Azul)
 Pablo González (Puebla)
 Carlos Gutiérrez (UNAM)
 Luis Montes (León)
 Alan Mozo (UNAM)
 Fernando Navarro (León)
 Oribe Peralta (Guadalajara)
 David Ramírez (León)
 Luis Romo (Cruz Azul)
 Juan Pablo Vigón (UNAM)

References

 
1
Liga MX seasons